Krondor: Jimmy and the Crawler is the fourth story in The Riftwar Legacy by fantasy author Raymond E. Feist. It is a novella combining concepts outlined for 2 additional novels (Krondor: The Crawler & Krondor: The Dark Mage) which were intended and subsequently canceled due to issues with Sierra, the producers of the Krondor computer games.

References

2013 American novels
Novels by Raymond E. Feist
American fantasy novels
Novels based on Krondor
HarperCollins books